Vasandhathil Or Naal is a 1982 Indian Tamil-language film, directed by A. C. Tirulokchandar and produced by S. Rangarajan. The film stars Sivaji Ganesan and Sripriya. It is a remake of the 1975 Hindi film Mausam. The film was released on 7 May 1982.

Plot 
Rajasekaran visits a village and falls in love with Raji. He promises her that he would go back to town, get his parent's approval and come back to marry her. However, circumstances alter and he is unable to fulfill his promise. Years pass and he hopes that she has married someone else and leads a peaceful life until he accidentally meets her in a brothel.

Turns out that the girl he saw there was not Raji but Neela, Raji's daughter. He buys her from the brothel and takes her to his home and tries to reform her. He finds out that Raji was forced to marry a crippled old man, raped by her brother-in-law, died of insanity while leaving Neela as a child who in turn was abused by the same brother-in-law and later sold to a brothel. Rajasekaran feels guilty and strives to redeem her.

Neela mistakes this for love and attempts to romance Rajasekaran who tells her the whole truth. She hates Rajasekarana and flees. After some convincing by the brothel madame and Rajasekaran accepting his guilt instead of defending himself, she chooses to forgive and he adopts her as his daughter.

Cast 
Sivaji Ganesan as Rajasekaran
Sripriya as Neela / Raji
V. K. Ramasamy
Thengai Srinivasan
S. Rama Rao

Soundtrack 
The soundtrack was composed by M. S. Viswanathan, with lyrics by Kannadasan.

Release and reception 
Vasandhathil Or Naal was released on 7 May 1982. S. Shivakumar of Mid-Day appreciated Sripriya for giving a "remarkably studied performance" and that she "sometimes steals scenes from the great thespian himself".

References

External links 
 

1980s Tamil-language films
1982 films
Films directed by A. C. Tirulokchandar
Films scored by M. S. Viswanathan
Tamil remakes of Hindi films